Golden Hits – 15 Hits of Pat Boone is an album by Pat Boone, released in 1967 on Dot Records.

Back in 1967, Billboard picked the album for the August 19 issue's "Special merit" section.

In his retrospective review for the website AllMusic, Arthur Rowe gives the album 2 stars out of 5, because, as he opines, it is "far from the best Pat Boone compilation on the market" and it is "suggested only to completists who absolutely must have everything in the singer's catalog".

Track listing

References 

1967 albums
Pat Boone albums
Dot Records compilation albums
Albums produced by Randy Wood (record producer)